Swami Ayyappan is a 2012 animated Indian film about the legend of Swami Ayyappan. It is the first animated portrayal of Ayyappan. The 90-minute film, produced through a collaboration of Toonz Animation India and Animagic Motion Pictures Production, was planned to be released in theatres in the Malayalam, Tamil, Kannada and Telugu languages. Mahesh Vettiyar wrote the story, and co-directed the film with Chetan Sharma. P. Jayakumar served as executive producer.

Synopsis
The film covers Ayyappan's life at Pandalam as the young Manikandan, born out of the union between Shiva and Vishnu in his Mohini avatar, his childhood at the gurukul, and the miracles he performed. It depicts Manikandan's fight with Udayana, the slaying of the demoness Mahishi and the instances that lead to his friendship with Vavar, a robber from Turkistan. This friendship is considered to be the epitome of religious tolerance till this day. Once the purpose of his embodiment is fulfilled, Manikandan gets united with the idol in the Sabarimala Temple and is henceforth known as ‘Swami Ayyappan’.

Reception
The movie's promo won a 2013 TASI Anifest India Viewer's Choice Award in the 'best film - commissioned' category, and a 2014 FICCI BAF award for Best Animated promo (international).

References

External links
 Official page on Facebook
 Swami Ayyappan at the Internet Movie Database

Indian animated films
2012 films
2012 animated films
Hindu mythological films